The Serre is a tributary of the river Oise in northern France, in the departments of Ardennes and Aisne. Its source is in the small village of La Férée, Ardennes, from which it flows west into the Aisne department. It flows through Montcornet, Marle and Crécy-sur-Serre and joins the Oise at La Fère.

References

Rivers of France
Rivers of Hauts-de-France
Rivers of Grand Est
Rivers of Aisne
Rivers of Ardennes (department)